Upper Sileru Project Site Camp is a census town in Alluri Sitharama Raju district  in the Indian state of Andhra Pradesh.

Demographics
 India census, Upper Sileru Project Site Camp had a population of 4744. Males constitute 54% of the population and females 46%. Upper Sileru Project Site Camp has an average literacy rate of 61%, higher than the national average of 59.5%: male literacy is 72%, and female literacy is 47%. In Upper Sileru Project Site Camp, 13% of the population is under 6 years of age.

Upper sileru project site camp is surrounded by many beautiful scenic places. It is a paradise for nature lovers. This area is full of forests with rich biodiversity.

Upper Sileru Hydro Power House

Upper Sileru Power project was built on Sileru River in Power Generation. Sileru river enters to Andhra Pradesh from Orissa through Upper Sileru. The same river passes through Donkarai and Mothu Gudem (Lower Sileru). The total power generation capacity of Upper Seleru project is 240 MW.  The projected owned and operated by APGENCO.  

People say the name of the river means Selayeru(సెలయేరు). It also has a UBI branch office.

References

 Villages in Alluri Sitharama Raju district